The Rock School for Dance Education is a classical ballet school located in Philadelphia, Pennsylvania .

The Rock School for Dance Education develops the whole dancer, enabling students to reach the highest standards of technique and artistry in a nurturing, supportive environment that elevates the art form, the dancer, and the audience. 

The Rock School for Dance Education is one of the world’s top pre-professional training institutions. Dancers from around the world have been to The School’s exceptional faculty, individual attention, nurturing environment, and the success of its alumni for more than 30 years. Throughout its history, the School has developed dancers for premier dance companies worldwide, as well as on Broadway and London’s West End. Rock students have competed and received honors in the Prix de Lausanne, Youth America Grand Prix, World Ballet Competitions, USA International Ballet Competition, Moscow IBC, and Berlin Tanzolymp. The faculty includes distinguished dancers, instructors, and choreographers serving more than 1,200 students. Rock School alumni dance in companies worldwide, including Pennsylvania Ballet, New York City Ballet, Pacific Northwest Ballet, San Francisco Ballet, Dutch National Ballet, and English National Ballet.

History 
At the urging of George Balanchine, Barbara Weisberger founded the School of Pennsylvania Ballet in 1962.  Mrs. Weisberger intended for her school to provide the finest classical ballet training for the dancers in her company, which premiered one year later as the Pennsylvania Ballet. For nearly forty years The School has been a premiere training ground for classical ballet while its students and alumni have graced the stages of Pennsylvania Ballet, New York City Ballet, American Ballet Theatre, and professional companies around the world.

The Pennsylvania Ballet School and Company maintained a close working relationship, but in 1992 they became independent non-profit entities. At that time the Company's Board decided that The School's mission and activities required the attention of an individual staff and Board of Trustees. It became evident that for further growth and increased contribution to the community, The School would need its own development department. The Milton and Shirley Rock Foundation had provided critical support to the Pennsylvania Ballet and The School and made it possible for them to move to their current facility on the Avenue of the Arts. In 1992, The School was renamed The Shirley Rock School of the Pennsylvania Ballet, after its beloved benefactress. 

The School's independence was accompanied by the development of a dedicated Board of Trustees, led by Chairman Constance W. Benoliel. The Trustees, directors Bo and Stephanie Spassoff, and their staff worked to establish community support for the new entity and to further its mission. Expanding its funding base, The School was able to develop its outreach activities and scholarship program with the goals of broadening access, increasing diversity, and creating a stronger presence in the community. In 2006, The School officially separated from the Pennsylvania Ballet and was renamed The Rock School for Dance Education. In 2011, the ballet documentary, First Position, followed Rock School Alum Michaela DePrince as she trained for and competed at Youth America Grand Prix. As a result of First Position’s popularity, The Rock School’s reputation continued to gain recognition in popular culture and cemented itself as a mainstay in the ballet zeitgeist.  

After over thirty-years as a director of the Rock School for Dance Education, Bo Spassoff retired, and in February of 2022, Peter Stark became the President and Director of the Rock School for Dance Education. Before joining the Rock School, Peter Stark was the associate director of Boston Ballet II and head of the Men’s Program for Boston Ballet School. He also served as Director of the Orlando Ballet School and founded of the Next Generation Ballet in Tampa, Florida.

Programs 

The Rock School annually offers dance classes to over 1,200 students, at our Rock Center and Rock West locations, from ages three and up. The Professional Division program is designed to meet the needs of advanced level students ages twelve to eighteen who aim to pursue careers in ballet; the program offers a nurturing class environment with focused attention on proper alignment, technique, and artistry. Many students in the professional division move to Philadelphia to attend the Rock School as full-time students who live in dorms located across the street from the school all while training to become professional ballet dancers and completing their education through the Rock Academics program. The Rock School has had students from over twenty countries and twenty-four states enrolled in the Professional Division. For Students under the age of twelve, The Rock School offers ballet classes through its Pre-Ballet and Ballet Division; these programs focus on progressing students’ ballet training at their own pace while instilling strong foundations for continued classical ballet training. The Rock School students perform throughout the year in their annual Classic Nutcracker, Spring Showcase, and at various ballet competitions. 

In the summer, The Rock School hosts about three hundred students for its annual Summer Intensive; summer intensive students train for one to six weeks with Rock School faculty, guest teaching artists, and alums. 

The vanguard of The Rock School's community engagement efforts, RockReach, is a multi-faceted outreach program founded in 2000 in response to inadequate arts education in Philadelphia schools. RockReach has become one of the most extensive dance and movement community programs in the Philadelphia region, annually serving thousands of students with free dance classes and interactive performance opportunities. Under White’s leadership, the program responds to new and immediate needs in Philadelphia schools through updated curricula, diversified faculty, and enhanced programming.

RockReach is the largest dance and movement community outreach program in the region, touching the lives of nearly 4,000 Philadelphia children annually. The program has four components: In-School Residencies, which include 32 weeks of 4 hours/dance instruction with live music integrated into each participating school’s curriculum; Dynamics of Dance, in-studio interactive assembly performances by students of The Rock School (TRS) and Residency schools for family and friends; City Dance, full-time scholarship program for students of low-income families to continue training at TRS after-school; and free tickets/transportation to TRS’s production of Classic Nutcracker.

Notable alumni 

Isaac Hernández and Esteban Hernández
Christine Shevchenko
Michaela DePrince

References

External links 
 

Dance in the United States
Ballet schools in the United States
Performing groups established in 1963
Dance in Pennsylvania
1963 establishments in Pennsylvania
Non-profit organizations based in Philadelphia